Love Unstoppable is an album from contemporary gospel singer Fred Hammond. The album was released on September 29, 2009 through Verity Records.

Track listing

 "Prelude: BreeAnn" -  Michelle & Darius Sean Hammond - 1:25
 "Awesome God"	- Fred Hammond - 7:18
 "Nobody Like You Lord" - 6:27
 "Find No Fault" - 5:48
 "Lost In You Again" - 4:34
 "I Need You Right Away" (featuring Michael Bethany) - 1:32
 "Best Thing That Ever Happened" - 5:22
 "They That Wait" (featuring John P. Kee) - 6:17
 "We Give You All The Praise" (featuring Ericka R. Warren) - 1:02
 "Take My Hand" - Fred Hammond - 5:50
 "I Know What He's Done" - 5:13
 "Thoughts Of Love" - 4:57
 "You're Good (Dios Es Bueno)" - 3:45
 "Lord How I Love You" - 6:07
 "Happy" - 4:25

Credits
Producers:
 Michael Bethany
 Ericka Warren
 Fred Hammond
 Ray Hammond

Executive Producers:
 Fred Hammond
 Ray Hammond

Worship Leader:
 Fred Hammond

Musicians:
 Calvin Rodgers – Drums
 Phillip Feaster – Keyboards, Organ
 Darius Fentress - Percussion
 Lawrence Jones - Guitar
 Shelton Summons - Keyboards
 Alan Evans II - Bass 
 Fred Hammond – Bass, Keyboards
 Bobby Sparks - Organ

Vocals: 
 Ericka Warren
 Michael Bethany
 Dynna Wilson Wells
 Destiny Williams
 John P. Kee

Engineers
 Darius Fentress - Engineer
 Derek "DC" Clark - Engineer
 Fred Hammond - Engineer, Mixing
 Ray Hammond - Engineer, Mixing

Awards

At the 41st GMA Dove Awards, Love Unstoppable won a Dove Award for Contemporary Gospel Album of the Year. Also, the song "Awesome God" was nominated for Contemporary Gospel Recorded Song of the Year.

Chart performance

The album peaked at #1 on Billboard's Gospel Albums chart. It has spent 66 weeks on the charts. The song "Awesome God" peaked at #14 on Billboard's Gospel Songs.

References

External links
Love Unstoppable in Amazon.com

2009 albums
Fred Hammond albums